Nelsonville is a village in Portage County, Wisconsin, United States. The population was 155 at the 2010 census.

History
The village was named after Jerome Nelson, an Englishman who started a sawmill along the Tomorrow River in 1855. It was incorporated in 1913, in part in an effort to remove saloons that the town of Amherst refused to outlaw.

Geography
Nelsonville is located at  (44.493067, -89.312358).

Demographics

2010 census
As of the census of 2010, there were 155 people, 61 households, and 39 families living in the village. The racial makeup of the village was 96.8% White, 0.6% African American, 0.6% from other races, and 1.9% from two or more races. Hispanic or Latino of any race were 1.3% of the population.

There were 61 households, of which 34.4% had children under the age of 18 living with them, 52.5% were married couples living together, 8.2% had a female householder with no husband present, 3.3% had a male householder with no wife present, and 36.1% were non-families. 26.2% of all households were made up of individuals, and 8.2% had someone living alone who was 65 years of age or older. The average household size was 2.54 and the average family size was 3.03.

The median age in the village was 42.5 years. 25.8% of residents were under the age of 18; 7.2% were between the ages of 18 and 24; 24.5% were from 25 to 44; 27.8% were from 45 to 64; and 14.8% were 65 years of age or older. The gender makeup of the village was 50.3% male and 49.7% female.

2000 census
As of the census of 2000, there were 191 people, 72 households, and 52 families living in the village. The population density was 190.7 people per square mile (73.7/km2). There were 74 housing units at an average density of 73.9 per square mile (28.6/km2). The racial makeup of the village was 97.38% White, 1.05% Native American, and 1.57% from two or more races.

There were 72 households, out of which 30.6% had children under the age of 18 living with them, 66.7% were married couples living together, 5.6% had a female householder with no husband present, and 26.4% were non-families. 23.6% of all households were made up of individuals, and 6.9% had someone living alone who was 65 years of age or older. The average household size was 2.65 and the average family size was 3.09.

In the village, the population was spread out, with 28.8% under the age of 18, 5.8% from 18 to 24, 33.5% from 25 to 44, 20.9% from 45 to 64, and 11.0% who were 65 years of age or older. The median age was 34 years. For every 100 females, there were 89.1 males. For every 100 females age 18 and over, there were 88.9 males.

The median income for a household in the village was $41,875, and the median income for a family was $56,250. Males had a median income of $32,500 versus $23,438 for females. The per capita income for the village was $19,708. None of the families and 2.4% of the population were living below the poverty line, including no under eighteens and 13.0% of those over 64.

References

Villages in Portage County, Wisconsin
Villages in Wisconsin